Pelonomites is a genus of ground beetles in the family Carabidae. There are about five described species in Pelonomites.

Species
These five species belong to the genus Pelonomites:
 Pelonomites celisi (Basilewsky, 1954)  (the Democratic Republic of the Congo and Uganda)
 Pelonomites coiffaiti Bruneau de Miré, 1990  (the Democratic Republic of the Congo)
 Pelonomites leleupi (Basilewsky, 1953)  (the Democratic Republic of the Congo)
 Pelonomites mahunkai Giachino, 2015  (Tanzania)
 Pelonomites vignai Zaballos & Casale, 1998  (Kenya)

References

Trechinae